Toolamba  is a town in the Goulburn Valley region of Victoria, Australia.

The Post Office opened on 1 January 1873. After the arrival of the railway this office closed and a Toolamba East office opened near the station, which was renamed Toolamba in 1895.

The railway station of the same name is located on the Goulburn Valley railway line opened in 1880, but was closed to passenger traffic in 1987. The station also serves as a junction with the line to Echuca. Currently the town has a General Store, Primary school (grades prep–6), a kindergarten, town hall and the Junction Hotel as well as a Bed and Breakfast.

Education
Toolamba Primary School is a primary school of approximately 190 students located in the township of Toolamba, on the western side of the Goulburn River. The principal is Heather Kennedy. It includes a kindergarten.

A fire destroyed the  primary school and kindergarten on Wednesday 3 February 2010. The school resumed back in Toolamba in March 2010 in a portable facility that was used until September 2012. The new school building was completed in October 2012.

See also
 Toolamba railway station

References

External links

Towns in Victoria (Australia)
City of Greater Shepparton